2672 Písek, provisional designation , is a Eunomia asteroid from the central regions of the asteroid belt, approximately  in diameter. It was discovered on 31 May 1979, by Yugoslav astronomer Jaroslav Květoň at the Kleť Observatory in the Czech Republic. The likely elongated asteroid is a suspected tumbler and a slow rotator with an exceptionally long period of 831 hours. It was named after the Czech town of Písek.

Orbit and classification 

Písek is a core member of the Eunomia family, a prominent family of stony S-type asteroid and the largest one in the intermediate main belt with more than 5,000 members. It orbits the Sun in the central main-belt at a distance of 2.2–3.0 AU once every 4 years and 3 months (1,543 days; semi-major axis of 2.61 AU). Its orbit has an eccentricity of 0.15 and an inclination of 14° with respect to the ecliptic.

Naming 

This minor planet was named after the Czech town of Písek, located in the western South Bohemian Region known for its many prolific Czech writers and artists. The official naming citation was published by the Minor Planet Center on 28 January 1983.

Physical characteristics 

Písek is an assumed S-type asteroid, which agrees with the overall spectral type for members of the Eunomia family. Conversely, the space-based surveys  found an albedo that is typical for a carbonaceous C-type or potentially darker D- and P-type asteroid (see below).

Rotation period 

Between May and July 2017, a rotational lightcurve of Písek was obtained from photometric observations by Vladimir Benishek at Belgrade Astronomical Observatory in Serbia. Lightcurve analysis gave a rotation period of  hours with a high brightness amplitude of 0.90 magnitude, indicative of a non-spherical shape.

Diameter and albedo 

According to the survey carried out by the Infrared Astronomical Satellite IRAS, the Japanese Akari satellite, and the NEOWISE mission of NASA's Wide-field Infrared Survey Explorer, Písek measures between 20.18 and 29.60 kilometers in diameter and its surface has an albedo between 0.0294 and 0.091.

The Collaborative Asteroid Lightcurve Link assumes a standard albedo of 0.21 – derived from 15 Eunomia, the parent body of the Eunomia family– and consequently calculates a much smaller diameter of 9.60 kilometers based on an absolute magnitude of 12.4.

References

External links 
 Asteroid Lightcurve Database (LCDB), query form (info )
 Dictionary of Minor Planet Names, Google books
 Discovery Circumstances: Numbered Minor Planets (1)-(5000) – Minor Planet Center
 
 

002672
Discoveries by Jaroslav Květoň
Named minor planets
002672
19790531